SS Duca d'Aosta was an Italian ocean liner for Navigazione Generale Italiana named after one of the Dukes of Aosta. Launched in 1908, she sailed between Italy and New York and South America for most of her career. During World War I she was employed as a troopship carrying United States troops to France as part of the United States Navy Cruiser and Transport Force. She was scrapped in 1929.

Early career 
Duca d'Aosta, was built by Cantieri Navale Siciliani of Palermo, with steam engines provided by N. Odero & Co. of Sestri Ponente. Launched on 29 September 1908 for Navigazione Generale Italiana, she sailed on her maiden voyage from Genoa to Naples and New York on 9 November 1909. She continued on this service until 20 November 1912, when she was switched to an Italy–South American route. On 7 July 1914, Duca d'Aosta resumed Genoa–New York service.

U.S. troopship duties 
In May 1918, Duca d'Aosta was chartered as a United States troop transport and attached to the United States Navy Cruiser and Transport Force, and sailed on a total of five roundtrips before the Armistice.

American cruiser  served as escort for the assembled ships, which were the 35th U.S. convoy of the war. On 20 May, the convoy sighted and fired on a "submarine" that turned out to be a bucket; the next day escort Frederick left the convoy after being relieved by nine destroyers. Three days later the convoy sighted land at 06:30 and anchored at Brest that afternoon. Duca d'Aosta safely arrived back in the U.S. on 5 June. Fate, however, was not as kind to former convoy mates President Lincoln and Dwinsk. On their return journeys they were sunk by German submarines U-90 and U-151, respectively.

Duca d'Aosta 's next convoy left Newport News on 23 June and consisted of the Italian steamers Caserta, the French , and American transports  and Susquehanna. Duca d'Aosta returned to Virginia on 19 July with Pocahontas.

Duca d'Aosta sailed again for France on 26 July with Pocahontas, Susquehanna, and Caserta from Newport News, and met up with U.S. Navy transports ,  and the Italian  that had sailed at the same time from New York. Duca d'Aosta arrived back in the United States on 18 August.

Duca d'Aosta 's convoy was escorted by Frederick and Colhoun.

Duca d'Aosta embarked from Genoa, Italy on March 29, 1919, carrying troops from the 332nd Infantry. She arrived in New York, New York on April 14, 1919.

Duca d'Aosta returned to the U.S. on 17 November, six days after the Armistice.

Later career 
After her release from the U.S. charter, Duca d'Aosta once again resumed sailing the Genoa–New York service in 1918, which she continued through June 1921. Returned to South American routes at that time, she continued in that service through February 1929 at which time she was scrapped.

Notes

References 

 
 
 
 
 

Ocean liners
Ships built in Palermo
World War I passenger ships of Italy
Troop ships of the United States
1908 ships